A paper divorce is a case in which a couple obtains a legal divorce but continues to live together as before. It may be done for financial reasons. If the divorce is fraudulent, it is called a sham divorce.

References

Divorce
Informal legal terminology